Kamal Matinuddin (1926–2017) was a Pakistani general, diplomat, and military historian. He authored works primarily on Pakistan's foreign policy, nuclear policy, and military history.

Early life
Kamal Matinuddin was born in 1926 to an Urdu speaking family of Hyderabad Deccan. He obtained his higher education from the University of Lucknow, before enrolling into the Indian Military Academy in 1946.

Military career
Following Pakistan's independence in 1947, Matinuddin was commissioned as a gunner in the 7th Field Regiment of the Royal Pakistan Artillery. He participated in the First Kashmir War, shelling enemy positions in the Bhimber sector. He studied at the Canadian Army Command and Staff College in Kingston, graduating in 1957. During his 34-year long service in the military, Matinuddin held various staff, instruction and command-related appointments, including heading an infantry division and assuming responsibility for operational planning as the Director General Joint Staff. He witnessed action in the Second Kashmir War and the 1971 War. In 1981, Matinuddin retired as a lieutenant-general from the Pakistan Army.

Diplomatic career
After retiring from the army, Matinuddin joined the Foreign Service and was appointed as Pakistan's ambassador to Thailand. He also served as Pakistan's Permanent Representative to the United Nations Economic and Social Commission for Asia and the Pacific in Bangkok.

Defence analysis
Upon returning to Pakistan, Matinuddin became the director-general of the Islamabad-based think tank Institute of Strategic Studies. In his book Tragedy of Errors (1994), Matinuddin addressed, studied and wrote an eyewitness account of the political differences and causes which underpinned the secession of East Pakistan. The book was translated by Muhammad Sheraz Dasti into Urdu and republished in 2018 as Naslon Ne Sazaa Payi. As a defence analyst, he wrote extensively on the conflict in Afghanistan and on Pakistan's nuclear weapons programme.

Works

Death
Matinuddin died on 5 February 2017 at the Combined Military Hospital in Rawalpindi, aged 90 or 91. His funeral was held at the city's Race Course Ground.

References

1926 births
2017 deaths
Ambassadors of Pakistan to Thailand
Defence and security analysts in Pakistan
Indian Military Academy alumni
Pakistani expatriates in Canada
Pakistani generals
Pakistani military historians
People from Rawalpindi
University of Lucknow alumni